John Thumwood (born 17 April 1785 at Hartley Row, Hampshire; died 13 November 1839 at Elvetham, Hampshire) was an English professional cricketer who played first-class cricket from 1816 to 1821.  He was mainly associated with Hampshire and made 8 known appearances in first-class matches, including one for the Players in 1821.

He was the elder brother of James Thumwood.

References

External links

Bibliography
 Arthur Haygarth, Scores & Biographies, Volumes 1-2 (1744–1840), Lillywhite, 1862

1785 births
1839 deaths
English cricketers
English cricketers of 1787 to 1825
Hampshire cricketers
Players cricketers
Godalming Cricket Club cricketers